Hermonax was a Greek vase painter working in the red-figure style. He painted between c. 470 and 440 BC in Athens.  Ten vases signed with the phrase "Hermonax has painted it" survive, mainly stamnoi and lekythoi. He is generally a painter of large pots, though some cups survive.

Background
Forming the beginning of the 'early classic' generation of vase-painters, Hermonax was a pupil of the Berlin Painter and a contemporary of the Providence Painter. Sir John Beazley attributed just over 150 vases to his hand.  His work has been found all over the ancient Greek world from Marseille to Southern Russia.

Hermonax entered the Berlin Painter's workshop towards its end.  As a pupil of the Berlin Painter Hermonax adopted the practice of painting large figural scenes on large vessels. His meander patterns, unlike those of his master, can be careless, as with the Providence Painter. A characteristic of his style is his depiction of the eyes with a concave bottom and a convex top.

The largest share of Hermonax' surviving work depicts Dionysiac themes.

Appraisal
As Beazley states, "Sound and able as Hermonax's work generally is, he only once shows himself a remarkable artist, and that is not on any of his signed vases, but on the Munich stamnos...with the Birth of Erichthonios - Hauser has pointed out what was modern in that vase when it was painted; how the painter rejects the old-fashioned agreements of figure, face, and dress, and turns to a new kind of simplicity and truthfulness: new in his day, and fresh still, because the artist put his own thought, his own feeling into his shapes, and that keeps them alive and green."

As the 'brother' of the Providence Painter, he is seen as less technically proficient.

Selected works
Adria, Museo Civico
fragments of a bowl B 34 • fragments of a bowl B 296 • fragments of a bowl B 785
Agrigento, Museo Archeologico Regionale
lekythos
Altenburg, Staatliches Lindenau-Museum
amphora 289 • oinochoe 297
Ancona, Museo Archeologico Nazionale
two fragments of different bowls
Argos, Archaeological Museum
bell krater C 909
Athens, Agora Museum
fragment of a loutrophoros P 15018 • hydria P 25101 • fragment of a stamnos P 25357 • fragment P 25357 A • fragment of a krater P 30017 • fragment of a bell krater P 30019 • fragment of a bowl CP 11948 • fragment of a lekythos P 30065 • fragment of a hydria P 30134 • fragments of a pelike P 8959 
Athens, Acropolis Museum
fragments of several loutrophoroi
Athens, National Archaeological Museum
fragment 2.692 • lekythos 1632
Baltimore, Walters Art Museum
amphora 48.55
Barcelona, Museo Arqueologico
lekythos 581 • fragment of a bowl 4233.6
Basel, Antikenmuseum Basel and Sammlung Ludwig
pelike BS 483 • oinochoe KA 430
Berne, Historisches Museum
pelike 26454
Bologna, Museo Civico Archeologico
oinochoe 344
Boston, Museum of Fine Arts
stamnos 01.8031
Boulogne, Musée Communal
amphora 125
Bristol, City Museum
hydria H 4631
Brussels, Royal Museums of Fine Arts of Belgium
pelike A 1579 • hydria A 3098
Bryn Mawr, Bryn Mawr College
fragment of a bowl P 199 • fragment of a bowl P 209 • fragment of a bowl P 989
Cambridge, Massachusetts, Harvard University, Arthur M. Sackler Museum
fragment of a bowl 1995.18.42
Catania, Museo Civico
hydria 706
Chicago, University of Chicago
pelike 171
Christchurch, University of Canterbury
amphora
Cologne, Cologne University
amphora 308
Columbia, Missouri, Museum of Art & Archeology
amphora 83.187
Corinth, Archaeological Museum
fragment of a krater C 66.40
Dresden, Albertinum
fragment of a bowl
Ferrara, Museo Nazionale di Spina
oinochoe 2461 • oinochoe B 31.5.1958 • lekanis T0 • oinochoe T 216 CVP • oinochoe T 607 • oinochoe T 897
Florence, Museo Archeologico Etrusco
fragment of a stamnos 14B5 • fragment 14B53 • stamnos 3995 • fragment of a stamnos PD 421
Gela, Museo Archeologico 
lekythos N 115
Glasgow, Museum & Art Gallery
pelike 1883.32A
Gotha, Schlossmuseum
amphora 50
Göttingen, Georg-August-Universität
fragment of a bowl H 74
Hartford, Wadsworth Atheneum
lekythos 1930.184      
Heidelberg, Ruprecht-Karls-Universität
fragment of a stamnos 170 • pelike 171 • fragment of a lekythos 172 • fragment of a bowl 173
Innsbruck, University
fragment of a bowl II.12.66 • fragment of a bowl II.12.67
Istanbul, Archaeology Museum
fragment A 33.2322 • fragment of a bowl A 33.2350
Karlsruhe, Badisches Landesmuseum
fragment of a bowl 69.35C • two fragments of a bowl 86.360 A-B • fragment of a bowl 69.35 C 
Kassel, Museum Schloß Wilhelmshöhe
amphora T 696
Lancut, Castle Museum
neck amphora S 8176
London, British Museum
amphora E 312 • pelike E 371 • pelike P 374 • stamnos E 445
London, Victoria & Albert Museum
hydria 4816.1858
Los Angeles, County Museum of Art
pelike A 5933.50.41
Madrid, Museo Arqueológico Nacional
amphora 11098 • amphora L 172
Mainz, Johannes Gutenberg Universität
fragment of a pelike (?) 144
Manchester, City Art Gallery & Museum
pelike III.I.41
Mannheim, Reiss-Museum
stamnos 59
Marseilles, Musée Borely
stamnos 1630 • pelike 3592 • pelike 7023
Melfi, Museo Nazionale del Melfese
amphora (loan → Metaponto)
Metaponto, Museo Civico
amphora 20113
Montreal, Museum of Fine Arts
fragment of a bowl RS 470
Moscow, Pushkin Museum
amphora 601  • amphora 1071

Munich, Glyptothek and Antikensammlung
stamnos 2413 • lekythos 2477 • lekythos 2478
Münster, Archaeological Museum of Münster University
lekythos 668
Naples, Museo Archeologico Nazionale
amphora 81481 • amphora H 3385  • pelike SP 2028
Naples, Palazzo di San Nicandro (Museo Mustilli)
pelike
New York, Metropolitan Museum of Art
lekythos 26.60.77 • lekythos 41.162.19 • bowl 1972.70.2 • fragment of a bowl 1972.257 • fragment of a bowl 1973.175.4A-B
Norwich, Castle Museum
amphora 36.96
Orvieto, Museo Civico (Collezione Faina)
bowl 43 • lekythos 66 A
Oxford, Ashmolean Museum
amphora 1966.500
Paestum, Museo Archeologico Nazionale
oinochoe 57799
Palermo, Collezione Collisani
amphora R 33
Palermo, Museo Archeologico Regionale
lekythos 1445 • lekythos V 672
Paris, Bibliothèque Nationale, Cabinet des Médailles
lekythos 489
Paris, Musée National du Louvre
pelike CP 10765 • fragment of a pelike CP 10766 • bowl CP 10955 • fragment of a pelike CP 11060 • fragment CP 11061 • fragment of a pelike CP 11064 • fragment of a stamnos CP 11065 • fragment of a stamnos CP 11067 • fragment CP 11068 •  fragment of a bowl CP 11944 • fragment of a bowl CP 11945 • fragment of a bowl CP 11946 • fragment of a bowl CP 11947 • fragment of a bowl CP 11948 • fragment of a bowl CP 11949 • fragment of a bowl CP 11950 • fragment of a bowl CP 11951 • fragment of a bowl CP 11952 • fragment of a bowl CP 11953 • fragment of a bowl CP 11954 • bowl G 268 • stamnos G 336 • pelike G 374 • amphora G 376 • stamnos 413 • stamnos G 416 • pelike G 546 • oinochoe G 573

Rhodes, Archaeological Museum
hydria 12884
Rome, Museo Nazionale di Villa Giulia
stamnos 5241 • pelike (Beazley Nr. 33) • pelike 50459
Samothrace, Archaeological Museum
fragment of a bell krater 
St. Louis, St. Louis Art Museum
amphora WU 3271 
San Simeon, Hearst Corporation
amphora 12359
St. Petersburg, Eremitage
amphora 696 • pelike 727 • stamnos 804 • stamnos 2070 • stamnos 4121 • fragment of a stamnos NB 6463 • amphora ST 1461 • amphora 1672 • amphora ST 1692 • stamnos ST 1694
Sarajevo, Zemaljski muzej Bosne i Hercegovine
fragment of a hydria 31 • loutrophoros 389 • fragment of a loutrophoros 425 • fragment of a loutrophoros 426
Stockholm, Medelhavsmuseum
bowl G2334
Syracuse, Museo Archeologico Regionale Paolo Orsi
lekythos 24552
Tampa, Tampa Museum of Art 
kylix 86.89
Trieste, Museo Storia ed Arte
stamnos S 424
Tübingen, University of Tübingen 
fragment of a bowl E 43 • fragment of a loutrophoros E 90 • fragment of a loutrophoros E 99 • fragment of a pelike S101583
Vatican City, Museo Gregoriano Etrusco Vaticano
stamnos 16526
Vienna, Kunsthistorisches Museum
pelike 336 • pelike 1095 • pelike IV 3728
Vienna, Vienna University
fragment of a bowl 503.50 • fragment
Wiesbaden, Landesamt
amphora
Würzburg, Martin von Wagner Museum
amphora L 504 
Zürich, Zurich University
fragment of a stamnos 3550 • bowl L 95

Bibliography
 Hanns E. Langenfass: Hermonax. Untersuchungen zur Chronologie. München, Univ., Diss. 1972.
 John H. Oakley: Athamas, Ino, Hermes, and the Infant Dionysos. A Hydria by Hermonax. Antike Kunst 25 (1982), p. 44-47. 
Cornelia Isler-Kerényi: Hermonax in Zürich, 1. Ein Puzzle mit Hermonaxscherben. Antike Kunst 26 (1983), p. 127-135.
 Cornelia Isler-Kerényi: Hermonax in Zürich, 2. Die Halsamphora Haniel. Antike Kunst 27 (1984), p. 54-57.
 Cornelia Isler-Kerényi: Hermonax in Zürich, 3. Der Schalenmaler. Antike Kunst 27 (1984), p. 154-165.
 Cornelia Isler-Kerényi: Hieron und Hermonax. In: Ancient Greek and related pottery. Proceedings of the international vase symposium, Amsterdam 12–15 April 1984 (Amsterdam 1984), p. 164. 
 Cornelia Isler-Kerényi: Hermonax e i suoi temi dionisiaci. In: Images et sociétés en Grèce ancienne. L'iconographie comme méthode d'analyse. Actes du Colloque international, Lausanne 8-11 février 1984 (Lausanne 1987), p. 169-175.

External links
Works by Hermonax in the Louvre
Vases by Hermonax at Perseus

5th-century BC deaths
5th-century BC Athenians
Ancient Greek vase painters
Year of birth unknown